Jo Woo-jin (born January 16, 1979) is a South Korean actor. He is known as an in-demand supporting or character actor on the big screen and TV series, such as Guardian: The Lonely and Great God (2017), Chicago Typewriter (2017), The Drug King (2018), Mr. Sunshine (2018), and Happiness (2021)  He won Best Supporting Actor award at the 40th Blue Dragon Film Awards in 2019 for his performance in the film Default.

Filmography

Film

Television

Radio shows

Awards and nominations

References

External links

 

1979 births
Living people
21st-century South Korean male actors
South Korean male television actors
South Korean male film actors
South Korean male stage actors
South Korean male musical theatre actors
Seoul Institute of the Arts alumni
People from Daegu
Best Supporting Actor Paeksang Arts Award (film) winners